Armenia has been a member of the Council of Europe, an international organization that focuses on strengthening democracy, human rights, and the rule of law across Europe, since 2001.

Accession 
Article 4 of the Council of Europe Statute specifies that membership in the Council of Europe is open to any European country, provided they meet specific democratic and human rights standards. Armenia became the 42nd member state of the Council of Europe on 25 January 2001. Armenia has been allotted 4 seats in the Parliamentary Assembly of the Council of Europe, the parliamentary wing of the Council of Europe.

Armenia is also a member of the Congress of Local and Regional Authorities, Group of States against Corruption, the European Commission against Racism and Intolerance, the European Commission for the Efficiency of Justice, the Committee for the Prevention of Torture, Eurimages, the Pompidou Group, and the Venice Commission; an advisory body of the Council of Europe.

On 25 January 2021, Ara Ayvazyan, former Minister of Foreign Affairs stated, “By acceding to the Council of Europe, Armenia joined the family of European states, with whom it shares common history, values, and ideals, as well as a vision of a future Europe, where fundamental rights and freedoms are protected for all, without distinction or discrimination,” in a statement on the 20th anniversary of Armenia's membership to the Council of Europe.

Objectives of membership 

Since 2005, Armenia has benefited from co-operation programs of the Council of Europe's Action Plans. Past and current programs, backed by the European Union, aim to enhance the independence and accountability of the justice system, ensure free and fair elections, protect minority rights and labour rights, promote gender equality and freedom of expression, strengthen child welfare, tackle domestic abuse, reform the penitentiary system, combat corruption, and contribute to the implementation of the goals set out in the Armenia-EU Comprehensive and Enhanced Partnership Agreement, which was finalized in 2017.

As stated in the 2019–2022 Council of Europe Action Plan for Armenia, "the Council of Europe and Armenia will continue co-operation to improve existing legislative frameworks, to ensure their effective implementation and to enhance the capacities of national institutions in bringing the country’s legislation and practices closer to European standards in order to promote human rights, strengthen the rule of law and ensure democratic principles of governance." The 2019–2022 Action Plan budget was €18,9 million.

On 27 January 2022, the Parliamentary Assembly of the Council of Europe, adopted a resolution praising Armenia's commitment to democratic reform. The Assembly welcomed the marked improvements made in electoral, judicial, and legislative reforms achieved since the 2018 Armenian revolution.

Council of Europe treaties 
As of January 2022, Armenia has signed 83 Council of Europe treaties, including:
 Berne Convention on the Conservation of European Wildlife and Natural Habitats
 Convention for the Protection of the Architectural Heritage of Europe
 European Charter for Regional or Minority Languages
 European Charter of Local Self-Government
 European Convention for the Prevention of Torture and Inhuman or Degrading Treatment or Punishment
 European Convention on Extradition
 European Convention on Human Rights
 European Convention on Mutual Assistance in Criminal Matters
 European Cultural Convention
 European Social Charter
 Framework Convention for the Protection of National Minorities
 Protection of Children Against Sexual Exploitation and Sexual Abuse
 Statute of the Council of Europe

European Court of Human Rights 

The European Court of Human Rights (ECHR) enforces the European Convention on Human Rights. Armenia is a contracting party of the convention. The jurisdiction of the court has been recognized by all 47 members of the Council of Europe, including Armenia. An Armenian citizen, group of individuals, or the state itself, may lodge an application to the court. In 2015, Armen Harutyunyan was elected as a judge to serve in the ECHR.

Committee of Ministers of the Council of Europe 
The Committee of Ministers of the Council of Europe is the Council of Europe's decision making body. Armenia held the chairmanship of the Committee of Ministers, for the first time, between May – November 2013. The main goals of the Armenian chairmanship were to combat racism and xenophobia in Europe, promote European values through intercultural dialogue, and foster democratic societies.

Financial contributions 
The Council of Europe's budget, for 2022, is €477 million. The contribution of Armenia is €540,141.

Representation 
The Council of Europe maintains a representative office in Yerevan. Armenia maintains a Permanent Mission in Strasbourg, France. On 2 December 2021, Arman Khachatryan was appointed by Prime Minister Nikol Pashinyan as Armenia's permanent representative to the Council of Europe. Following his inauguration, Khachatryan stated that, "The Armenian government highly appreciates the support provided by the Council of Europe in the field of democratic reforms, ensuring the rule of law and protection of human rights". Khachatryan reaffirmed the commitment of the Government of Armenia to deepen the agenda of cooperation with the Council of Europe.

Recent developments 
Following the 2020 Nagorno-Karabakh war, the Council of Europe called on Armenia and Azerbaijan to immediately stop the renewed escalation of hostilities. The Council of Europe released a statement supporting both sides to seek a peaceful resolution to the Nagorno-Karabakh conflict through mediation by the OSCE Minsk Group.

On 9 June 2022, the president of the Venice Commission Claire Bazy-Malaurie visited Armenia and met with President of Armenia Vahagn Khachaturyan. President Khachaturyan stated, "The Council of Europe has a special significance for Armenia as Armenia is cooperating very closely with the structure since independence, and the CoE is one of the key partners of Armenia." In return, Bazy-Malaurie said that "Armenia is a stable and reliable partner of the Council of Europe."

On 16 June 2022, the Secretary General of the Council of Europe Marija Pejčinović Burić paid an official visit to Armenia to mark the 20th anniversary of Armenia's accession to the Council of Europe. Burić held meetings with several representatives, including Prime Minister Nikol Pashinyan.

On 16 February 2023, the Council of Europe Action Plan for Armenia 2023-2026 was officially launched during a ceremony held in Yerevan. The action plan will focus on the advancement of human rights, protection of women's rights and minority rights, fighting corruption, judicial reform, aligning Armenian legislation to European standards, among other goals. Armenian Foreign Minister Ararat Mirzoyan stated, "The action plan is a key instrument in the ambitious reforms agenda of the Armenian government aimed at the further development of democratic institutions in line with European standards, establishment of an independent judiciary and strengthening of anti-corruption institutions." The Foreign Minister reaffirmed the Armenian government's commitment to the principles and values of the Council of Europe, which are stipulated in the Armenian government's program. The allocated budget for the action plan is €19 million.

See also 
 Armenia and the United Nations
 Armenia–European Union relations
 Armenia–NATO relations
 Armenia–OSCE relations
 European integration
 Foreign relations of Armenia
 Member states of the Council of Europe
 Member states of the Venice Commission
 Politics of Armenia
 Politics of Europe

References

External links 
 Official website
 Council of Europe Office in Yerevan
 Armenia in the Council of Europe on Twitter
 Council of Europe Action Plan for Armenia 2023-2026

Council of Europe
European integration
Foreign relations of Armenia
Human rights in Armenia
Armenia
2001 in Armenia